Aman Kandi (also Romanized as Aman Kandī) is a village in Ajorluy-ye Sharqi Rural District, Baruq District, Miandoab County, West Azerbaijan Province, Iran. At the 2006 census, its population was 23, in 4 families.

References 

Populated places in Miandoab County